Dioscorides (fl. 225 BC), sometimes known as Dioscurides, was a Stoic philosopher, the father of Zeno of Tarsus and a pupil of Chrysippus. All other information has been lost.

Another Dioscorides is mentioned by Diogenes Laërtius. This philosopher was a Pyrrhonist, and was a student of Timon of Phlius.

Dedication
Chrysippus dedicated the following works to Dioscorides:
 Four books on Probable Conjunctive Reasons
 Five books on the Art of Reasoning and of Modes
 A solution, according to the principles of the ancients, of the law of non-contradiction
 Five volumes of Dialectic Arguments, with no solution
 Two books on Probable Arguments bearing on Definitions
 An essay on Rhetoric, spanning four books

References

3rd-century BC philosophers
Stoic philosophers
Logicians